Klubi Futbollistik Trepça, commonly known as KF Trepça, is a football club based in the southern part of Mitrovica, Kosovo. The club was founded in 1932. 

KF Trepça is the first Kosovo Football club to gain promotion in to the Yugoslav First League) in 1977-78 after winning the Yugoslav Second League in 1976–77 as the first Club in Kosovo to do so. Trepça was one of only two Clubs in Kosovo with  KF Prishtina who competed in the Yugoslav First League. They also reached the Finals off the 1977–78 Yugoslav Cup in which they lost against HNK Rijeka with 0-1 being also the first and only Kosovo Football Club to achieve this success.

History 

Trepça was founded in 1932 by workers of the Trepça Mines in Mitrovica during the period of the Kingdom of Yugoslavia. From the founding year until 1938, the club did not have an own venue, so coached and played on a playing field in the neighboring town Zveçan. In 1938, a small field was built where they played until the Second World War. Later they received its own stadium, the Trepça Stadium, which offered then about 30,000 spectators. Both Albanians and serbs played for the club, Albanian players that marked the pre-WWII period were Mazllum Grushti, Hasko Bula, Gota Sezair, Ejup Kerveshi, Adnan Mustafa, Ahmed and Qamil Zajmi, Hysen Murati, Xhati Zhubi, Sali Pllana, Bedri Hamza, Shinasi Rizanolli, Ahmet Shukriu, Burhan Kurkuqi, Jakup Berisha, Qazim Pllana, Sami Konjusha, Agim Deva, Ekrem Neziri, Riza Gashi, etc. Gota Cezair was a Prizren-born player who, after playing with Trepça, went to Italy to study Economy at the University of Firenze, and, while there, he played for Carrarese Calcio. and later returned to Yugoslavia and played with FK Vardar in Yugoslav First and Second Leagues.

During the Second World War, the Kosovo Albanian players of Trepça, played for the Albanian football club called KF Skënderbeu, which was active during the war and the fascist occupation. After the end of the war, Trepça was long in the shadow of numerous Yugoslav clubs. However, in 1977 came the first major success for the club, when they achieved the promotion to the Yugoslav First League.

In the following 1977–78 season, the club relegated in the Yugoslav Second League, but managed to achieve the 1977–78 Yugoslav Cup final, where they lost against NK Rijeka by 0–1 after extra time. During this period, the club's nickname Xehetarët (The Miners) was especially popular, and the Trepça players Dragan Mutibarić, Dragan Simeunović and Vladan Radača became members of the Yugoslav national football team. During the 1960s, 1970s and 1980s the players that emerged in the club were Sali Qubreli, Jakup Abrashi, Ajet Shosholli, Hysni Maxhuni, Luan Prekazi, Rexhep Xhaka, Erdogan Celina, Esat Mehmeti, Ramadan Cimili, Fisnik Ademi, Adnan Zeqiri, Ibrahim Prekazi, Faruk Domi, Aqif Shehu, Mensur Nexhipi, Rafet Prekazi, Genc Hoxha, Avni Juniku, Bakir Burri, Hasan Shasivari, Shemsedin Ajeti, Vahedin Ajeti, Ahmet Turku, Gani Llapashtica, Isa Sadriu, Bardhec Seferi, Sadik Rrahmani, among others.

The main supporters of KF Trepça are TORCIDA 1984 which were formed on 20 March 1984. Their biggest rival is KF Prishtina.

Stadium
After the Kosovo war in 1999, the city was divided into a southern part with an almost exclusively Kosovo Albanian population and a northern part with a non-Albanian or predominantly Serb population. During the war, many Serbs and non-Albanians fled to the northern part of the city or were expelled. The 2004 unrest in Kosovo reinforced the ethnic division of the city.

The home ground of the club is now the Trepča Stadium, the same stadium where the Serbian club FK Trepča played until 1999. The stadium is located in the southern part of the city, but FK Trepča is based in North Kosovska Mitrovica, in North Kosovo; it is not currently possible for them to play their home matches in their former home stadium. Currently, only Albanian teams play in Trepča Stadium, including the KF Trepça. The Trepča Stadium is now called Olympik Stadiumi Adem Jashari by the Kosovo Albanian population, after Adem Jashari, a former leader of the Albanian paramilitary rebel organisation UÇK; the non-Albanian population still uses the name Stadion Trepča. The stadium is the largest in Kosovo with a capacity of 18,200.

Honours
Kosovar Superliga
Winners (2): 1993, 2010

Kosovo Province League
Winners (5): 1947, 1949, 1950, 1952, 1955

Kosovar Cup
Winners (1): 1992

Yugoslav Second League (1):
Champion: 1976–77 (promoted to Yugoslav First League)

Yugoslav Cup (1):
Runner-up: 1978

Players

Current squad

Notes

References 

 
Football clubs in Kosovo
Sport in Mitrovica, Kosovo
Association football clubs established in 1999
1999 establishments in Kosovo